ReadWrite (originally ReadWriteWeb or RWW) is a Web technology blog launched in 2003. RW covers Web 2.0 and Web technology in general, and provides industry news, reviews, and analysis. Founded by Richard MacManus, Technorati ranked ReadWriteWeb at number 12 in its list of top 100 blogs worldwide, as of October 9, 2010. MacManus is based in Lower Hutt, New Zealand, but the officers and writers of RW work from diverse locations, including Portland, Oregon. Around September or October 2008, The New York Times technology section began syndicating RW content online.
RW also has many international channels such as France, Spain, Brazil and China.

RW was acquired by SAY Media in 2011.

On October 22, 2012, RWW redesigned its website, rebranded as ReadWrite and hired Daniel Lyons as the new editor-in-chief. Dan Lyons left ReadWrite on March 20, 2013, replaced by Owen Thomas.

SAY Media sold ReadWrite to Wearable World in February 2015.

In June 2015, the company announced a crowd funding campaign.

Editor In Chief

See also
 Ars Technica
 Techdirt
 Mashable
 TechCrunch

References

External links
 Supplemental Content on NYTimes.com Short description of ReadWriteWeb
 ReadWriteWeb Brazil ReadWriteWeb Brazil
 ReadWriteWeb China ReadWriteWeb China
 ReadWriteWeb France  ReadWriteWeb France
 ReadWriteWeb Spain ReadWriteWeb Spain

Information technology companies of New Zealand
American technology news websites
Internet properties established in 2003